Champs Elysées is the second studio album by French DJ Bob Sinclar, released in October 2000 on Yellow Productions. It reached number 28 in France and number 94 in Switzerland.

Critical reception

John Bush of AllMusic wrote that with the album, Sinclar "proved himself a solid producer despite the lack of freshness, adding in plenty of swooping strings, nickel-bag guitars, and soft-toned keyboards", calling "Got to Be Free" and "Darlin'" "disco-mover productions that wouldn't sound out of place on classic American R&B radio", and concluding that Sinclar "has plenty of fun throughout the LP". Piers Martin of NME was considerably more negative, calling most of Champs Elysées "a feeble facsimile" of the "fabled times" of "New York's early-'80s club culture" and the sound of disco. Martin summarised the album as a "predictable whirl of artificial strings, filtered loops and strident glitterball house", judging that "it's clear Sinclar doesn't have an original idea in his impeccably coiffured head".

Track listing
"Champs Elysées Theme" – 4:26
"I Feel for You" – 5:50
"You Are Beautiful" – 2:06
"Striptease" – 4:29
"Got to Be Free" – 5:43
"Life" – 6:25
"Save Our Soul" – 4:22
"Phasing News" – 4:05
"Ich Rocke" – 4:06
"Freedom" – 6:30
"Darlin'" – 5:00

Bonus track on some CD versions
 "My Only Love" – 3:33

French CD and digital bonus tracks
 "I Feel for You" (Bob's Disco Remix) – 7:14
"Ich Rocke" (Turntablerocker Remix) – 5:11

Charts

References

2000 albums
Bob Sinclar albums
Yellow Productions albums